Henry Noel Waldegrave, 11th Earl Waldegrave (14 October 1854 – 30 December 1936) was a British peer and minister of religion.

Waldegrave was born in 1854, the posthumous son of William Waldegrave, Viscount Chewton (the eldest son of William Waldegrave, 8th Earl Waldegrave) and his wife Frances Waldegrave, Viscountess Chewton. He was educated at Eton and graduated from Trinity College, Cambridge in 1878. He then entered the ministry and was rector of Stoke d'Abernon from 1890 to 1898, Marston Bigot from 1905 to 1912 and some time for Orchardleigh and Lullington.

On 27 October 1892, he married Anne Katharine Bastard, daughter of Rev. William Pollexfen Bastard and Caroline (Woollcombe) Bastard. They had five children.

In 1933, he inherited his nephew's titles, and on his own death in 1936 was succeeded by his eldest son, Geoffrey.

References

1854 births
1936 deaths
People from Mendip District
People from Somerset
Earls Waldegrave
People educated at Eton College
Alumni of Trinity College, Cambridge
Ordained peers
People from Stoke d'Abernon